Guido van Helten (born 1986) is an Australian artist, known for his photorealistic murals.

Van Helten was raised in Brisbane and was a graffiti artist in his youth. He moved to Lismore, New South Wales to study visual arts at Southern Cross University, majoring in printmaking.

Van Helten's work Brim Silo Art project, a large mural painted on the grain silos at Brim, Victoria, an example of the growing genre of silo art, was a finalist in 2016 Sulman Prize.

Van Helten painted a mural on the former BB&T building in downtown Greenville, South Carolina, "to give voice to traditionally Black communities on the west side of Greenville", after a commission in 2019.

References

External links

Official website

Living people
Street artists
Southern Cross University alumni
1986 births